Terence Michael "Terry" Forrest is a justice of the Court of Appeal of the Supreme Court of Victoria in Australia.

Forrest was admitted to the legal profession in 1979 and was appointed Queen's Counsel in 1999.

Forrest was appointed as a judge in the Trial Division of the Supreme Court in 2009. He was elevated to the Court of Appeal on 10 July 2018.

His brother, Jack Forrest, is also a judge of the Supreme Court of Victoria. His father, James Herbert Forrest, was a County Court judge and Acting Chief Judge of that court.

References

Judges of the Supreme Court of Victoria
Living people
Year of birth missing (living people)
Place of birth missing (living people)
20th-century Australian lawyers
21st-century Australian lawyers
Australian King's Counsel